The House at 25 Clyde Street in Somerville, Massachusetts is an example of a vernacular brickworker's house in the area.  It is estimated to have been built about 1850, when the area was near one of the city's many brickyards.  One characteristic common to these houses was the high brick basement wall, which is visible in this house.

The house was listed on the National Register of Historic Places in 1989.

By May 2014, the house was partially demolished, renovated and converted into a 3-unit condo. The entire shed in the back yard was demolished.

Gallery

Before condo conversion, December 2012

Condo conversion, May 2014

See also
National Register of Historic Places listings in Somerville, Massachusetts

References

Houses on the National Register of Historic Places in Somerville, Massachusetts
Houses completed in 1850
1850 establishments in Massachusetts